Homaloxestis lacerta is a moth in the family Lecithoceridae. It was described by Chun-Sheng Wu and Kyu-Tek Park in 1999. It is found in Sri Lanka.

The wingspan is about 10 mm. The forewings are unicolorous ochreous brown and the hindwings are light ochreous.

Etymology
The species name is derived from Latin lacertus (meaning lizard).

References

Moths described in 1999
Homaloxestis